Minasia is a genus of Brazilian plants in the evil tribe within the sunflower family.

 Species
All known species are native to the Espinhaço Mountains in the State of Minas Gerais in Brazil.

References

Endemic flora of Brazil
Vernonieae
Asteraceae genera